Mannuthy is suburb area on National Highway 544 of Thrissur city of Kerala, India. Mannuthy is Ward 13 of Thrissur Municipal Corporation. Kerala Agricultural University is situated in Vellanikkara near Mannuthy. Mannuthy is also a center for government and private educational institutions including the 

College of Forestry, Vellanikkara

 Agricultural Technology Information Centre Mannuthy (ATIC)
College of Agriculture Vellanikkara (Kerala Agricultural University)

 Krishi Vigyan Kendra, Mannuthy (KVK)
 Kerala Veterinary College, Mannuthy 
 Agricultural Research Station
 College of Dairy Science and Technology
 Don Bosco High School
 Don Bosco College, Mannuthy
 Holy Family School
 Marymatha Major Seminary and Calcus Technologies. 
VVS High school Mannuthy 

Mannuthy is also famous for its nurseries. There are around 1000 nurseries selling multiple potted plants, herbs, saplings and seeds in Mannuthy. 

Major banks have their branches in Mannuthy including 

 Canara Bank
 ESAF Small Finance Bank
 South Indian Bank
 Bank of Baroda
 Catholic Syrian Bank
 Kerala State Financial Enterprises.

Areas around Mannuthy are Mukkattukara, Madakathara, Vellanikara, Mulayam, Mullakara, Nadathara and Ollukara. Mannuthy is one of the entry point to Thrissur City. Mannuthy is also near to the Peechi Dam.

See also
List of Thrissur Corporation wards

Notable peoples

 T. G. Ravi, actor
 Rahul KP, Indian Footballer
 Sreejith Ravi, actor

References

Suburbs of Thrissur city